The First Ministry of Narendra Modi is the Council of Ministers headed by Narendra Modi that was formed after the 2014 general election which was held in nine phases from 7 April to 12 May in 2014. The results of the election were announced on 16 May 2014 and this led to the formation of the 16th Lok Sabha. The Council assumed office from 27 May 2014.

The Council of Ministers included 10 female ministers, of whom 6 held the rank of Cabinet minister. This is the highest number of female Cabinet ministers in any Indian government in history. The only other government to appoint more than 1 female Cabinet minister, was the first UPA government from 2004 to 2009, which had 3 female Cabinet Ministers.

Background

The 2014 general election was held in nine phases from 7 April to 12 May, to constitute the 16th Lok Sabha. The results of the election were announced on 16 May 2014. On 20 May 2014, a meeting of the parliamentary party of BJP was organised at the Central Hall of the Parliament of India and Narendra Modi was elected as its leader. Subsequently, BJP president Rajnath Singh along with other leaders of the ally parties of NDA, met President Pranab Mukherjee at Rashtrapati Bhavan and handed over the support letter of 335 members of parliament and claimed for the government formation. Following this, Mukherjee invited Modi and under the powers vested on him under Constitution of India, appointed him as the Prime Minister of India and sought his advice for the names of the members of the council of ministers of his government. On 9 November 2014, there was an expansion and reshuffling in his cabinet and 21 new cabinet ministers were sworn in.

History
Prime Minister Narendra Modi appointed Nripendra Misra as his Principal Secretary and Ajit Doval as National Security Advisor (NSA) in his first week in office. He also appointed IAS officer A.K. Sharma and Indian Forest Service officer Bharat Lal as joint secretaries in the Prime Minister's Office (PMO). Both officers were part of Modi's government in Gujarat during his tenure as Chief Minister.

On 31 May 2014, Prime Minister Modi abolished all existing Group of Ministers (GoMs) and Empowered Group of Ministers (EGoMs). A statement from the PMO explained, "This would expedite the process of decision making and usher in greater accountability in the system. The Ministries and Departments will now process the issues pending before the EGoMs and GoMs and take appropriate decisions at the level of Ministries and Departments itself". The UPA-II government had set up 68 GoMs and 14 EGoMs during its tenure, of which 9 EGoMs and 21 GoMs were inherited by the new government. The move was described by the Indian media as being in alignment with Modi's policy of "minimum government, maximum governance". The Indian Express stated that the GoMs and EGoMs had become "a symbol and an instrument of policy paralysis during the previous UPA government". The Times of India described the new government's decision as "a move to restore the authority of the Union Cabinet in decision-making and ensure ministerial accountability".

Newly appointed cabinet minister Gopinath Munde, who was in charge of the Rural Development, Panchayati Raj, and Drinking Water and Sanitation portfolios, died in a car crash in Delhi on 3 June 2014. Cabinet minister Nitin Gadkari, who is in charge of Road Transport and Highways, and Shipping, was assigned to look after Munde's portfolios on 4 June.

On 10 June 2014, in another step to downsize the government, Modi abolished four Standing Committees of the Cabinet. He also decided to reconstitute five crucial Cabinet Committees. These included the Cabinet Committee on Security (CCS) that handles all high-level defence and security matters, the Appointments Committee of Cabinet (ACC) that recommends to the President all senior bureaucratic appointments and postings, the Cabinet Committee on Political Affairs (CCPA) which is a sort of small cabinet and the Cabinet Committee on Parliamentary Affairs.

The Prime Minister and the Council of Ministers submitted their resignation to President Ram Nath Kovind on 24 May 2019, after the completion of their 5-year term. The President accepted the resignations and requested the Council of Ministers to continue until the new government assumed office.

List of Council members 
Council portfolios are as follows:

Source:

Cabinet ministers
Note:
(I/C) - (Independent Charge)

!Remarks

|}

Ministers of State (Independent Charge) 

!Remarks

|}

Ministers of State

!Remarks
 

|}

Demographics of the Council of Ministers

NDA Cabinet by Party

See also
 Foreign policy of Narendra Modi
 Politics of India
 Modi's Gujarat Ministry (2001–2014)
 Council of Ministers of the Republic of India

References

External links

Website of Cabinet Secretariat of India
Council of Ministers – Official Portal of the Indian Government

India
Modi administration
Cabinets established in 2014
Indian union ministries
2014 establishments in India
Narendra Modi-related lists
Bharatiya Janata Party
Shiv Sena
Shiromani Akali Dal
Lok Janshakti Party
Apna Dal (Sonelal)
Republican Party of India (Athawale)
2019 disestablishments in India